This is a list of operational hydroelectric power stations in Canada with a current nameplate capacity of at least 100 MW.

The Sir Adam Beck I Hydroelectric Generating Station in Ontario was the first hydroelectric power station in Canada to have a capacity of at least 100 MW upon completion in 1922. Since then numerous other hydroelectric power stations have surpassed the 100 MW threshold. All but two of Canada's provinces or territories are home to at least one hydroelectric power station, those without being Prince Edward Island and Nunavut.

List of power stations

Under construction 
This is a list of the hydroelectric power stations under construction with an expected nameplate capacity of at least 100 MW.

See also
List of power stations in Canada by type
List of hydroelectric power stations in the United States

References

External links

Hydro